Nightwings is an album by the guitarist Pat Martino, recorded in 1994 and released on the Muse label in 1996.

Reception

AllMusic awarded the album 3 stars, stating: "Martino favors a more-is-more approach here, a welcome change for fans of his earlier recordings. His chops are on full display".

Writing for All About Jazz, Douglas Payne called Nightwings "Martino's least convincing album ever," and commented: "Even the guitarist feels lazy and apathetic as he scales some of the most mundane changes he's ever charted. Certainly this disc has its share of admirers. I'm not convinced; mostly because Martino does little here that's persuasive... listen to Nightwings simply to hear how a master sounds on an off day."

Track listing 
All compositions by Pat Martino
 "Draw Me Down" - 11:54   
 "Portrait" - 8:04   
 "Villa Hermosa" - 15:59   
 "I Sing the Blues Every Night" - 7:32   
 "A Love Within" - 6:28   
 "Nightwings" - 6:34

Personnel 
Pat Martino - guitar
Bob Kenmotsu - tenor saxophone 
James Ridl - piano 
Marc Johnson - bass
Bill Stewart - drums

References 

Pat Martino albums
1996 albums
Muse Records albums